Mahbubul Haque Khan (28 February 1950 – 5 June 2011), best known as Azam Khan, was a Bangladeshi singer-songwriter, record producer, and lead singer for the pop-rock band "Uccharon". He was also a freedom fighter. He took part in the Liberation War of Bangladesh in 1971. He is considered to be one of the greatest artists in the history of Bangladeshi popular music.

Born and raised in Dhaka, he had been interested in music since his childhood and ultimately began his music career in his hometown with the group "ক্রান্তি শিল্পী গোষ্ঠী (Trinity Artist Group)" in 1967. He took part in the 1969 mass uprising, against the Pakistani army. In 1971, inspired by his father, he and his brothers took part in the Liberation War of Bangladesh. He was trained in Meghaloy, India. He fought in the Sector 2, under Major Khaled Mosharraf. In mid-December, 1971 he came back from the camps and started his music career again. He founded the pioneering rock band "Uchcharon", along with his friends Nilu (lead guitars) and Mansoor (rhythm guitars), Sadek (drums). They first appeared on Bangladesh Television in 1972. They got commercial success with the hit "রেল লাইনের বস্তিতে (In the Slum Beside the Rail Line)" in 1975. Releasing more hit songs in the 1970s, like "আলাল ও দুলাল (Alal and Dulal)", "সালেকা মালেকা (Saleka Maleka)" and "পাপড়ি কেন বোঝেনা? (Why Doesn't Papri Understand?)". Khan died in June 2011 from oral cancer in Dhaka.

His contribution to the music industry, brought him the second highest civilian honour award "Ekushe Padak", which he was awarded posthumously in 2019 and also earned the honorific nicknames "The Pop Samrat" (The Pop Emperor) and "The Rock Guru".

Early life 

Khan was born on 28 February 1950 in Azimpur, Dhaka to Aftabuddin Khan and Jobeda Begum. They used to live in the No. 10 Government Quarter Colony. His father was the administrative officer of Secretariat Home Department, as well as a homeopathic doctor on the side. His mother Jobeda, was a singer, a source of his passion for music. He had three brothers — Sayeed Khan, Alam Khan, Leyakot Ali Khan and a sister – Shamima Akhter Khanom. In 1956, his father built a house in Kamalapur. He was admitted to Motijheel Provincial School. In 1965, he was admitted to Siddheswari Boys' High School in the commercial division, from where he passed the SSC exam in 1968.

He then attended T & T College in 1970, but his studies were hindered by the Liberation War in which he partook with his father and siblings.

Participation in Liberation War 

In 1969, Khan took part in the mass uprising in East Pakistan (Public Awakening, গণঅভ্যুত্থান) against the West Pakistan government. He was a member of the Trinity Artist Group (ক্রান্তি শিল্পী গোষ্ঠী) then. He used to compose songs against Pakistani rulers. In 1971, his father Aftabuddin became the senior officer in the secretariat. His father inspired he and his brothers to go to the war. He went to Agartala on foot with his two friends. His target was to work under major Khaled Mosharraf in Sector 2. He took part in the war at the age of 21. He went to Melaghar Camp in India for training. At the end of the training, he fought against the Pakistani army in Comilla. He first fought straight after some time in Saldah, after that he returned to Agartala again. He was then sent to Dhaka to take part in the guerrilla war. Khan was in charge of a section of two sectors. The sector commander was colonel Khaled Mosharraf. In Dhaka, he took part in several guerrilla attacks in Dhaka and around it as a section commander. Khan was basically responsible for managing guerrilla operations in Jatrabari-Gulshan area. The most notable of these was "Operation Titas" under his leadership. Their duty was to destroy some gas pipelines in Dhaka, especially Hotel Intercontinental (Now Sheraton Hotel), Hotel Purbani obstructing gas supply. Their goal was to make sure that the foreigners staying in those hotels can understand that a war is going on in the country. In this war, he was hit in his left ear which later obstructed his hearing. Azam Khan entered Dhaka with his accomplices in mid-December 1971. Earlier than that, they defeated the Pakistani army in a battle organized in Trimohani near Madartek. The name of the guerrilla team he participated in was Crack Platoon.

Career 

Azam Khan was a Bangladeshi freedom fighter. He fought in Sector 2 under Brigadier Khaled Mosharraf in the Liberation war of Bangladesh in 1971. After the war, he entered the music arena. He founded the band "উচ্চারণ (Pronunciation)" in 1973. The 'legendary guitarist,' Rocket then joined the band. Khan's first appearance in music domain was from Spondon's musical program and performance at Bangladesh Television, in DIT Building in Dhaka about 3rd quarter of 1972 with rock singers like Nasir Ahmed Apu, Firoz Shai. Guitarist Mansur, Congo player Naseem of "স্পন্দন (Pulsation)". The program was directed by Mansur Ahmed Nipu of "স্পন্দন (Pulsation)" and produced by Noazesh Ali Khan of BTV. His rock band earned instant reputation and Azam Khan came to be known as "Rock Guru". Some of his biggest hits are "Ore Saleka, Ore Maleka", "Jibone Kichhu Pabona Re", "Ami Jare Chaire", "Ashi Ashi Bole Tumi", "Obhimani", "Rail liner bostite", "Hei Allah Hei Allah Re", "Alal O Dulal".

He was also a passionate cricketer, having played in Dhaka's second division league as late as 1998, when he was around 48.

Personal life 

Khan married Sahida Begum on 14 January 1981 in Madartek, Dhaka, at the age of 31. The couple had three children. The first daughter Ima Khan, first son Hridoy Khan and second daughter Aroni Khan. Khan divorced his wife in 1993.

Death 

Khan died on 5 June 2011 at Dhaka Combined Military Hospital at the age of 61. He was suffering from oral cancer which had spread to his lungs. In 2013, Khan's family established "Azam Khan Foundation" aiming to help destitute artists.

Khan, along with his contemporaries Fakir Alamgir, Ferdous Wahid, Pilu Momtaz, Firoz Shai and Nazma Zaman is credited with pioneering popular music in Bangladesh. About his career, pop singer Habib Wahid said, "the history of Bangladeshi rock music began with Azam Khan. His songs were very popular in the post-independence Bangladesh, and they haven't lost their appeal at all." Female rock artist Mila Islam said, "Azam Khan introduced the genre rock and roll to Bangladeshi people." Indie musician Shayan Chowdhury Arnob said, "He is not among us anymore but his songs will keep his spirit alive. He'll live forever through his music."

Influences 
His influences included famous Indian singers such as Kishore Kumar, Hemanta Mukherjee, Manna Dey and British rock bands like, the Beatles and the Rolling Stones. His mother who was a singer herself, was most likely his biggest influence however, for she was responsible for instilling in him a passion for music from a very early age.

Awards 

Khan has been awarded several awards for his contributions to the country and the Bangladeshi music. In 1993, he won the Best Pop Singer Award, Television Audience Award in 2002. He also received the Lifetime Achievement Award with Coca-Cola gold bottle, Award of Council of Urban Guerilla, Dhaka '71 and Freedom Fighter Award from Radio Today. On 20 February 2019, he was awarded the second highest civilian honour award "Ekushey Padak" posthumously for his contribution to the 1971 Liberation War and Bangladeshi music industry by prime minister Sheikh Hasina.

Discography 

 "অভিমানী (Arrogant)"
 "আলাল ও দুলাল (Alal and Dulal)"
 "মাটির পৃথিবীতে (On the Earth)" 
 "বাংলাদেশ (Bangladesh)"
 "কিছু চাওয়া (Something to Ask)"
 "দিদিমা (Granny)"
 "কেউ নাই আমার (I Have No One)"
 "নীল নয়না (Blue Eyes)"
 "পুরে যাচ্ছে (It’s Burning)"
 "রেল লাইনের ওই বস্তিতে (In the Slum Beside the Rail Line)"
 "গুরু তোমায় সালাম (Salam to You, Guru)" (2011)
 "সালেকা মালেকা (Saleka Maleka)" (2017)

Filmography

Further reading

References

External links

Azam Khan on Discogs
Azam Khan on BBC Music

1950 births
2011 deaths
20th-century Bangladeshi male singers
20th-century Bangladeshi singers
Bangladeshi pop singers
21st-century Bangladeshi male singers
21st-century Bangladeshi singers
Bangladesh Liberation War
Recipients of the Ekushey Padak in arts